The Order of Merit for Macedonia is the fourth highest state recognition of North Macedonia. As its name implies, is recognition of Merit for Macedonia .

Notable recipients
2006-Petre M. Andreevski
2007-Mateja Matevski
2007-Cvetan Grozdanov
2009-Simon Trpceski
2010-Esma Redzepova
2011-Otto von Habsburg
2011-Struga Poetry Evenings
2011-Liana Dumitrescu
2011-South East European University
2011-Peace Corps United States
2011-Tose Proeski
2014-Macedonian Radio Television

References

Orders, decorations, and medals of North Macedonia
Awards established in 2002